A military council is an approach to organization by a council with representatives from various bodies.

The term "military council" applied to organisational groupings of senior ranking officers in the European armies of the 19th century during operational planning, also refers to the practice retained in the Soviet Union's Red Army until 1947.

As a proper noun term it may refer to:

 Military Council for Justice and Democracy, the supreme political body of Mauritania
 Military Council of National Salvation, a military group administering Poland during the period of martial law, 1981–1983
 Revolutionary Military Council, the supreme military authority of Soviet Russia from 1918 to 1934
 Transitional Military Council (1985), a council created to lead Sudan, lasted from April 1985 to April 1986
Transitional Military Council (2019), a council created to lead Sudan, lasted from April to August 2019
Transitional Military Council (Chad), a council created to lead Chad after the death of president Idriss Déby, established April 2021
 Shura Council of Benghazi Revolutionaries, an islamist coalition created in 2014 during the Second Libyan Civil War
One of the Syrian Democratic Forces military councils, each of which unifies local units loyal to the Syrian Democratic Forces in the context of the Syrian Civil War

References

Military organizational structures
Councils
Former disambiguation pages converted to set index articles